Shavon Owner John-Brown (born 13 April 1995) is a Grenadian footballer who plays as a forward for the Grenada national team. He last played club football for USL Championship club El Paso Locomotive.

Early life
John-Brown was born in Montreal, Quebec to Grenadian parents. At a young age, he returned with his family to their home village of River Sallee, St. Patrick.

Club career
John-Brown played for Hard Rock FC in the Grenada League Premier Division. In his debut season he scored eight goals for the club, assisting them on their way to the league title.

In April 2021, John-Brown joined National Independent Soccer Association side New Amsterdam FC ahead of the spring 2021 season.

John-Brown signed with USL Championship club El Paso Locomotive FC on March 1, 2022. He made 12 appearances for the club before an injury left him sidelined until his departure from the club following the 2022 season.

International career
John-Brown earned his first cap for the Grenada national team on 22 February 2012, coming on as a substitute in a friendly against Guyana.

He had previously played three games for the under-17 squad. He scored two goals at this level, both coming in Grenada's 4–3 victory over Saint Vincent and the Grenadines in a 2011 CONCACAF U-17 Championship qualifying match.

International goals
Scores and results list Grenada's goal tally first.

Honours
 Hard Rock FC
 Grenada League Premier Division: 2011

 New York Cosmos B
 NPSL North Atlantic Conference Champion: 2019
 NPSL Northeast Region Champion: 2019
2016 Great Midwest Athletic Conference Offensive Player of the Year.

References

External links
 USL League Two page

1995 births
Living people
Canadian people of Grenadian descent
Grenadian footballers
Soccer players from Montreal
Association football forwards
Bryant and Stratton College alumni
Alderson Broaddus Battlers men's soccer players
Charlotte Eagles players
Brooklyn Italians players
New York Pancyprian-Freedoms players
New York Cosmos B players
New York Cosmos (2010) players
New Amsterdam FC players
El Paso Locomotive FC players
National Independent Soccer Association players
National Premier Soccer League players
USL League Two players
Grenada international footballers
Grenada under-20 international footballers
Grenada youth international footballers
2021 CONCACAF Gold Cup players
Grenadian expatriate footballers
Expatriate soccer players in the United States
Grenadian expatriate sportspeople in the United States
Expatriate footballers in Germany